Kinga Wojtasik (born 2 June 1990), née Kołosińska, is a Polish beach volleyball player. As of 2016, she plays with Monika Brzostek. They have qualified for 2016 Summer Olympics in Rio de Janeiro.

References

External links
 
 
 
 

1990 births
Living people
Polish beach volleyball players
Women's beach volleyball players
Beach volleyball players at the 2016 Summer Olympics
Olympic beach volleyball players of Poland
Sportspeople from Lublin
Universiade medalists in beach volleyball
Universiade silver medalists for Poland
Medalists at the 2013 Summer Universiade
21st-century Polish people